Khawaja Muhammad Safdar was a Pakistani politician from Pakistan Muslim League.

Early life and career
He was born in Sialkot and took an active part in the Pakistan Movement before 1947. In 1981, he was nominated as chairman of Majlis-e-Shoora, Pakistan and also acted as acting president of Pakistan in this capacity. 

He is the father of foreign minister of Pakistan in 2017, Khawaja Muhammad Asif. 
He was elected Member of Provincial Assembly of West Pakistan in 1962 and was thereafter elected as leader of opposition. He was re-elected to both these position in 1965. and served in those positions till 25 March 1969, when General Agha Muhammad Yahya Khan seized power and dissolved the Assemblies. Khawaja Muhammad Safdar contested 1970 elections in Pakistan but lost to a nominee of Pakistan Peoples Party.

Sialkot Medical College was set up in Sialkot in 2011 which was later renamed after Khawaja Muhammad Safdar as Khawaja Muhammad Safdar Medical College. A famous main boulevard in Sialkot on which Khwaja Muhammad Safdar Medical College lies has also been named as Khwaja Muhammad Safdar Road.

See also
Khawaja Muhammad Safdar Medical College

References

Pakistani MNAs 1962–1965
Pakistani MNAs 1965–1969
Punjabi people
Pakistani people of Kashmiri descent
Pakistan Movement activists
Pakistan Muslim League politicians
People from Sialkot